Cristina, Minas Gerais is a municipality in the state of Minas Gerais in the Southeast region of Brazil.

Notable people 
 Delfim Moreira, 10th President of Brazil

See also
List of municipalities in Minas Gerais

References

Municipalities in Minas Gerais